"The Knight's Tomb" is a short poem of eleven lines written by Samuel Taylor Coleridge, and published by the author in 1834. The date of composition is uncertain, although an early version was quoted from in print as early as 1820.

Text 
The poem was first published in Poetical Works (1834).

History 

James Gillman says that these lines were composed 'as an experiment for a metre', and repeated by the author to 'a mutual friend', who 'spoke of his visit to Highgate' and repeated them to Scott on the following day. The last three lines, 'somewhat altered', had previously been quoted by Sir Walter Scott in Ivanhoe (1820), chapter viii, and again in Castle Dangerous (1831), chapter ix. They run thus:—

Gillman says that the Ivanhoe quotation convinced Coleridge that Scott was the author of the Waverley Novels. In the Appendix to the 'Notes' to Castle Dangerous, which was edited and partly drawn up by John Gibson Lockhart, a different version of the poem is quoted in full, with a prefatory note ('The author has somewhat altered part of a beautiful unpublished fragment of Coleridge').

This version must have been transcribed from a manuscript in Lockhart's possession, and represents a first draft of the lines as published in 1834. These lines are, no doubt, an 'experiment for a metre'. The upward movement (ll. 1–7) is dactylic: the fall (ll. 8–11) is almost, if not altogether, spondaic. The whole forms a complete stanza, or metrical scheme, which may be compared with ll. 264–78 of the First Part of Christabel. Sara Coleridge, who must have been familiar with Gillman's story, dates the composition of "The Knight's Tomb" to 1802.

References

Bibliography 

 Coleridge, E. H. (1912). The Complete Poetical Works of Samuel Taylor Coleridge. Vol. 1. Oxford: Clarendon Press. 
 Gibbs, Warren E. (1933). "S. T. Coleridge's 'The Knight’s Tomb' and 'Youth and Age'". The Modern Language Review, 28(1): pp. 83–85. 
 Gillman, James (1838). The Life of Samuel Taylor Coleridge. Vol. 1. London: William Pickering. 

British poems
1834 poems
Poetry by Samuel Taylor Coleridge